Pleasure to Burn is the second studio album by hard rock band Burning Rain. It was released in 2000 on Pony Canyon. It is the last album with Ian Mayo on bass guitar and Alex Makarovich on drums. The band was on hiatus after touring.

Track listing
All songs written by Doug Aldrich and Keith St. John.

Personnel
Keith St. John – vocals
Doug Aldrich – guitars, producing
Ian Mayo – bass guitar
Alex Makarovich – drums

Additional personnel
Edward Roth – keyboards
Jimmy Church - engineering
Yukiko Tanaka - engineering
Jeff Glixman - mixing
Will Sandalls - mixing
Dave Donnelly - mastering

External links
Heavy Harmonies page
Burning Rain official website

Burning Rain albums
2000 albums